No. 586 Squadron RAF was a proposed electronic warfare squadron of the Royal Air Force during the Second World War.

History
The squadron was formed on paper on 10 December 1943. It was going to be an electronic warfare unit flying the Boeing Fortress Mk.II. It was decided to use 214 Squadron in this role and the squadron creation was cancelled on 30 December 1943, without it ever having any aircraft or personnel.

See also
List of Royal Air Force aircraft squadrons

References

Citations

Bibliography

Military units and formations established in 1943
Aircraft squadrons of the Royal Air Force in World War II
586 Squadron